The 1955 Pacific hurricane seasons began on May 15, 1955, in the northeast Pacific Ocean and on June 1, 1955, in the central Pacific.
They ended on November 30, 1955. These dates conventionally delimit the time of year when most tropical cyclones form in northeast Pacific Ocean.

Before the satellite age started in the 1960s, data on east Pacific hurricanes is extremely unreliable. Most east Pacific storms are of no threat to land. Six tropical systems were observed this season.

Systems

Hurricane One

Hurricane One existed from June 6 to June 8.

Tropical Storm Two

Tropical Storm Two existed from June 8 to June 11.

Tropical Storm Three

Tropical Storm Three existed from July 6 to July 9.

Tropical Storm Four

Tropical Storm Four developed on September 1st and moved away from Mexico while weakening. This stormed dissipated on September 5.

Tropical Storm Five

In early October, the remnants of Hurricane Janet entered the Pacific Ocean, which later re-organized into the fifth tropical storm of the Pacific hurricane season. On October 1, the storm began to curve northwestward due to a ridge over Texas. Over the following days, however, a shortwave over the United States West Coast forced to the storm to the north and then east. The tropical storm maintained the same intensity throughout its existence, before making landfall on Baja California Sur at 0600 UTC on October 3. The disturbance crossed back into the Gulf of California, where it dissipated the following day. The remnants of the cyclone later moved into Sonora. In the United States, rainfall was spread throughout areas of Arizona and New Mexico.

Hurricane Six

In mid-October, a hurricane hit southwestern Mexico.

See also
List of Pacific hurricanes
Pacific hurricane season
1955 Atlantic hurricane season
1955 Pacific typhoon season
 Australian region cyclone seasons: 1954–55 1955–56
 South Pacific cyclone seasons: 1954–55 1955–56
 South-West Indian Ocean cyclone seasons: 1954–55 1955–56

References

 
Pacific hurricane seasons